Lai-Zhen Yu (1923–2004) was a former Chinese actress and Cantonese opera singer from Hong Kong. Yu is credited with over 140 films.

Early life 
In 1923, Yu was born in Guangdong, China.

Career 
At age 16, Yu performed Cantonese opera. Yu performed Cantonese opera in the United States, South East Asia, and Hong Kong. In Hong Kong, Yu co-founded Guanghua Opera Troupe. In 1947, Yu crossed over as an actress in Hong Kong films. Yu first appeared in Cuckoo's Spirit in March, a 1947 Drama film directed by Hung Suk-Wan. In 1959, Yu co-founded Lishi Film Production Company. Yu is known for her role as the Headless Queen in Cantonese opera films. In 1968, Yu retired from the film industry.

Yu's last film was The Plot, a 1967 Historical Drama film directed by Wong Hok-Sing. Yu is credited with over 140 films.

Repertoire 
 An Agnostic and Sagacious Intercession
 The God's Story
 Emperor's Nocturnal Sacrifice (debut opposite Sun Ma Sze Tsang) 
 The Crab Beauty (Fantasy)
 The Skeleton Tower under the Sea (Fantasy)

Filmography

Films 
This is a partial list of films.
 1947 Cuckoo's Spirit in March 
 1951 A King Speaks His Heart 
 1963 The Prince Becomes a Monk
 1967 The Plot (aka Teaching the Son to Slay the Emperor, Revenge of the Prince) - Cuckoo, Lau's wife.

Personal life 
Yu's husband was Lee Siu-wan, a writer for films. Within the Cantonese Opera community, Lee was also part of the establishment. He explained at a press conference how applications of new performers for Barwo membership were blocked until weeks before their scheduled (1 July 1972) performances.

After retirement, Yu immigrated to Canada. On 4 March 2004, Yu died.

Discography 
 CR-2063, Emperor's Nocturnal Sacrifice

References

External links 
HK Film Archive's "Morning Matinee" to feature diverse works of Yu Lai-Zhen
Iconic Heroines in Cantonese Opera Films
 Chiu Lai Jan at hkcinemagic.com
 
 

1923 births
2004 deaths
Hong Kong Cantonese opera actresses
Hong Kong film actresses
Chinese emigrants to British Hong Kong